Circobotys nycterina is a moth in the family Crambidae. It was described by Arthur Gardiner Butler in 1879. It is found in Japan and Russia.

References

Moths described in 1879
Pyraustinae